Arixyleborus mediosectus, is a species of weevil found in India, Sri Lanka, Cambodia, Myanmar, Philippines, Malaysia, Indonesia: Sumatra and Vietnam.

Description
Body is about 2.1 mm long. Body long and cylindrical. Pronotum blackish brown. Elytra, legs and antennae are light brown. Head globose with moderately convex frons. Surface of the head is reticulate with sparse punctures and fine hairs. Eyes are elongate, and deeply emarginate. Antenna with 5 segmental funicle, short scape and obliquely truncate club. Pronotum elongate with substriaght basal margin and sides. Posterior portion of pronotum finely reticulate with sparse minute punctures. Scutellum is sub-round and small. Elytra broad as pronotum and with a substraight  basal margin. Nearly half of elytra is smooth, flat and dull. Elytral striae marked by moderately large and very shallow punctures. Elytral interstriae covered with sparse hair-like setae. Elytral declivity is with plano-convex declivital face. Declivity is distinctly carinate and distinctly raised with prominent tubercles.

Biology
A polyphagous species, it is commonly found in many Dipterocarpus species.

Host plants
 Artocarpus chaplasa
 Balanocarpus heimii 
 Canarium euphyllum
 Dendrocalamus strictus
 Terminalia bialata
 Dipterocarpus pilosus
 Dipterocarpus turbinatus
 Dipterocarpus zeylanicus

References 

Curculionidae
Insects of Sri Lanka
Beetles described in 1923